Okey is a surname, and may refer to:

Chris Okey (born 1994), American baseball player
Frank Okey (born 1919), American tennis and squash champion 
Henry Okey (1857–1918), New Zealand politician
Howard Okey (born 1906), Australian rules footballer
John Okey (1606–1662), English soldier, Member of Parliament and regicide
Jack Okey (1889–1963), American art director
John W. Okey (1827–1885), American judge and legal author
Mark Okey, American politician
Shannon Okey (born 1975), American writer and knit designer
Thomas Okey (1852–1935), translator from Italian